Karolina Tymińska (born 4 October 1984 in Świebodzin) is a Polish heptathlete. She has represented Poland twice at the Olympic Games (2008 and 2012) and three times at the World Championships in Athletics (2007, 2009 and 2011). She is the bronze medalist in the heptathlon from the 2011 World Championships in Athletics, having originally come fourth in the event before the disqualification, in 2016, of Tatyana Chernova.

Tymińska also regularly competes in the indoor pentathlon event: at the IAAF World Indoor Championships she placed fourth in 2012 and sixth in both 2008 and 2010.

Her personal best in indoor pentathlon result is 4769 points, achieved in July 2008 in Spała. In heptathlon her personal best result is 6544 achieved in August 2011 in Daegu.

She won the European Cup Combined Events title in 2013 with a score of 6347 points, defeating Hanna Melnychenko and setting a javelin throw best of 42.40 m. She placed second at the Decastar meeting with 6288 points.

Achievements

References

1984 births
Living people
Polish heptathletes
Athletes (track and field) at the 2008 Summer Olympics
Athletes (track and field) at the 2012 Summer Olympics
Olympic athletes of Poland
People from Świebodzin
Sportspeople from Lubusz Voivodeship
World Athletics Championships athletes for Poland
20th-century Polish women
21st-century Polish women